Brea (Spanish for "tar") is a city in northern Orange County, California. The population as of the 2010 census was 39,282. Brea is part of the Los Angeles metropolitan area.

The city began as a center of crude oil production, was later propelled by citrus production. It is a significant retail center, including the Brea Mall and downtown Brea. The city has an extensive public art program which began in 1975 and continues today with over 140 artworks in the collection placed and located throughout the city.

History

Indigenous 
The area began as part of the homelands of the Tongva, who lived in the area for thousands of years before any contact was made with Europeans. The tribe stewarded the land and established numerous villages in the area interconnected by extensive trails for travel and trade with neighboring Indigenous nations. The closest known village site to the city of Brea today is Hutuknga.

Spanish era 
The area was visited on July 29, 1769, by the Spanish Portolá expedition – the first Europeans to see inland parts of Alta California. The party camped in Brea Canyon, near a large native village and a small pool of clean water. A historical marker dedicated to his visit stands in Brea Canyon just north of town.

The village of Olinda was founded in present-day Carbon Canyon at the beginning of the 19th century and many entrepreneurs came to the area searching for "black gold" (petroleum).

American era 
In 1908 the village of Randolph, named for railway engineer Epes Randolph, was founded just south of Brea Canyon for oil workers and their families. Baseball legend Walter Johnson grew up in Olinda at the start of the 20th century where he worked in the surrounding oil fields as a youth.
 
The villages of Olinda and Randolph grew and merged as the economy boomed. On January 19, 1911, the town's map was filed under the new name of Brea, from the Spanish language word for natural asphalt, also called bitumen, pitch or tar. With a population of 752, Brea was incorporated on February 23, 1917, as the eighth official city of Orange County.

As oil production declined, some agricultural development took place, especially lemon and orange groves. In the 1920s, the Brea Chamber of Commerce promoted the city with the slogan “Oil, Oranges, and Opportunity.” 

In 1950, Brea had a population of 3,208, which is 641 more than ten years prior. The citrus groves gave way gradually to industrial parks and residential development. In 1956, Carl N. Karcher opened the first two Carl's Jr. restaurants in Anaheim, California and Brea, California. The opening of the Orange Freeway (57) and the Brea Mall in the 1970s spurred further residential growth, including large planned developments east of the 57 Freeway in the 1980s, 1990s, and 2000s. 

In the late 1990s, a  swath of downtown Brea centered on Brea Boulevard and Birch Street was heavily redeveloped into a shopping and entertainment area with movie theaters, sidewalk cafes, a live comedy club from The Improv chain, numerous shops and restaurants, and a weekly farmer's market. It is locally known and signed as Downtown Brea. The downtown area opened in 2000.

Sunset magazine named Brea one of the five best suburbs to live in the Western United States in early 2006.

Geography

It is bordered by unincorporated Orange County and Los Angeles County to the north and east, La Habra to the west, Fullerton to the southwest, Placentia to the south, and Yorba Linda to the southeast.

Climate
According to the Köppen Climate Classification system, Brea has a hot-summer Mediterranean climate, abbreviated "Csa" on climate maps.

Government

Local
Brea is governed by a council-manager system. The five-member city council is elected to four-year terms in elections held every two years to fill alternately two and three seats. The council is made up of the mayor, the mayor pro tem and three councilmembers. The council elects a mayor from the serving councilmembers to serve a one-year term as mayor. The city council hires a city manager to direct the city's departments and advise the council. The council appoints members of the Planning Commission; Parks, Recreation and Human Services Commission; Cultural Arts Commission, and Traffic Committee.

City services
Fire protection for Brea is provided by the Brea Fire Department (BFD) and law enforcement is provided by the Brea Police Department. Within Carbon Canyon, in the Olinda neighborhood of Brea, is situated Olinda Landfill, a major waste management facility serving a large part of Orange County.

Management of the city and coordination of city services is provided by:

State and federal representation

Demographics

2010
The 2010 United States Census reported that Brea had a population of 39,282. The racial makeup of Brea was 26,363 (67.1%) White (52.7% Non-Hispanic White), 549 (1.4%) African American, 190 (0.5%) Native American, 7,144 (18.2%) Asian, 69 (0.2%) Pacific Islander, 3,236 (8.2%) from other races, and 1,731 (4.4%) from two or more races. Hispanic or Latino of any race were 9,817 persons (25.0%).

The census reported that 39,213 people (99.8% of the population) lived in households, 69 (0.2%) lived in non-institutionalized group quarters, and 0 (0%) were institutionalized.

There were 14,266 households, out of which 5,043 (35.3%) had children under the age of 18 living in them, 8,132 (57.0%) were opposite-sex married couples living together, 1,605 (11.3%) had a female householder with no husband present, 632 (4.4%) had a male householder with no wife present. There were 569 (4.0%) unmarried opposite-sex partnerships, and 100 (0.7%) same-sex married couples or partnerships. 3,070 households (21.5%) were made up of individuals, and 1,265 (8.9%) had someone living alone who was 65 years of age or older. The average household size was 2.75. There were 10,369 families (72.7% of all households); the average family size was 3.23.

The population was spread out, with 9,057 people (23.1%) under the age of 18, 3,654 people (9.3%) aged 18 to 24, 10,669 people (27.2%) aged 25 to 44, 10,952 people (27.9%) aged 45 to 64, and 4,950 people (12.6%) who were 65 years of age or older. The median age was 38.7 years. For every 100 females, there were 95.2 males. For every 100 females age 18 and over, there were 91.9 males.

The homeowner vacancy rate was 1.3%; the rental vacancy rate was 5.3%. 26,889 people (68.5% of the population) lived in owner-occupied housing units and 12,324 people (31.4%) lived in rental housing units.

According to the 2010 United States Census, Brea had a median household income of $82,055, with 5.6% of the population living below the federal poverty line.

2000
There were 13,067 households, out of which 34.6% had children under the age of 18 living with them, 56.6% were married couples living together, 10.5% had a female householder with no husband present, and 28.8% were non-families. 23.0% of all households were made up of individuals, and 8.5% had someone living alone who was 65 years of age or older. The average household size was 2.70 and the average family size was 3.21.

In the city, the population was spread out, with 25.6% under the age of 18, 8.5% from 18 to 24, 30.4% from 25 to 44, 24.1% from 45 to 64, and 11.4% who were 65 years of age or older. The median age was 36 years. For every 100 females, there were 95.3 males. For every 100 females age 18 and over, there were 91.9 males.

The median income for a household in the city was $64,820, and the median income for a family was $68,423. Males had a median income of $50,500 versus $35,674 for females. The per capita income for the city was $26,307. About 3.4% of families and 5.3% of the population were below the poverty line, including 6.7% of those under age 18 and 5.2% of those age 65 or over.

Politics
Brea is traditionally a Republican stronghold at the presidential level; however, Democratic candidate Joe Biden carried the city in 2020. According to the California Secretary of State, as of October 22, 2018, Brea has 24,775 registered voters. Of those, 9,991 (40.33%) are registered Republicans, 7,370 (29.75%) are registered Democrats, and 6,466 (26.10%) have declined to state a political party or are independents.

Economy

Top employers
According to the city's 2019 Comprehensive Annual Financial Report, the top employers in the city are:

Education
The city is primarily served by the Brea Olinda Unified School District which operates six elementary schools, one junior high school (Brea Junior High School), one high school (Brea Olinda High School) and one continuation high school (Brea Canyon High School). A small portion of Brea is also directed to Sonora High School in La Habra in the Fullerton Joint Union High School District. That small portion is also directed to the La Habra City School District. In addition, students can also take an assessment to place in nearby Troy High School in Fullerton, also part of the Fullerton High School District.

There are many private schools in Brea, the Brea Head Start (Pre) Brea Olinda Friends School (Pre-6), Brea Congregational Pre-School, Brea Foursquare Church (Pre-5), Brea United Methodist Pre-School ("BUMPS"), Carbon Canyon Christian School (K-12), Christ Lutheran School (Pre-8), St. Angela Merici Parish School (TK-8), and Montessori of Brea (K-6). Brea is also home to the Southern California College of Business and Law and the Southern California extension of Golden Gate Baptist Theological Seminary.

School awards

Local schools have won several awards. Brea Olinda High School and Olinda Elementary School have been named Blue Ribbon Schools. Additionally, Arovista Elementary, Country Hills Elementary, Fanning Elementary, Mariposa Elementary, Olinda Elementary, Brea Junior High and Brea Olinda High schools have been named California Distinguished Schools. Laurel Elementary received a Title I Academic Achievement Award. Brea Junior High School and Brea Olinda High School have been named California Gold Ribbon Schools.

Notable people 
 Cody Fajardo, Quarterback for the Montreal Alouettes
 Stephanie J. Block, Broadway actress/singer
 James Cameron, film director/producer/screenwriter
 JoAnn Dean Killingsworth, actress & dancer, first person to play Snow White at Disneyland
 Travis Denker, Major League baseball player (San Francisco Giants)
 Kyle Fogg, professional basketball player
 Tommy Gallarda, Pro Football player (Atlanta Falcons)
 James Hetfield, musician (Metallica)
 Walter Johnson, Major League baseball pitcher for the Washington Senators
 Randy Jones, Major League baseball player (San Diego Padres)
 Joe Maddon, Major League baseball manager (Chicago Cubs)
 Alli Mauzey, Broadway actress/singer
 Evan Moore, Pro Football player (Green Bay Packers)
 Jeanette Pohlen, Women's National Basketball Association player (Indiana Fever)
 Cruz Reynoso, jurist
 Ken Spears, animator & co-founder of Ruby-Spears Productions
 Caroline Zhang, figure skater
 Nikki Ziering, model and actress
 Norma Zimmer, singer

Sister cities

Brea is twinned with:
 Anseong, South Korea (2011)
 Hannō, Japan (1980)
 Lagos de Moreno, Mexico (1969)

References

External links

 
 
 
 
 
 
City Of Brea Art Gallery

 
Cities in Orange County, California
Incorporated cities and towns in California
Populated places established in 1917
1917 establishments in California